Ethminolia glaphyrella is a species of sea snail, a marine gastropod mollusk in the family Trochidae, the top snails.

Description
The size of the rotund-conoidal shell attains 6 mm. A neat little, rather solid species, with a very pale straw colour. The apex is obtuse. The shell contains five, ventricose whorls. The sutures are impressed. The shell is uniformly delicately transversely lirate. Under a lens some very obscure small brown spotted markings on the lirae, and larger spots at the periphery, are observable. The body whorl is subangulate at the periphery and has dark brown spots. The shell has a deep but narrow umbilicus  The small aperture is roundish. The outer lip is barely swollen. The margin of the columella is a little contracted.

Distribution
This marine species occurs off the Loyalty Islands.

References

External links
 To World Register of Marine Species
 

glaphyrella
Gastropods described in 1895